is a 2022 action role-playing game developed by Tose and published by Square Enix for the Nintendo Switch. A spin-off of the Dragon Quest series, the game takes place on the floating continent of Draconia and follows the siblings Erik and Mia from Dragon Quest XI in search of seven legendary Dragonstones. Dragon Quest Treasures received mixed reception from critics.

References

External links
 

2022 video games
Dragon Quest video games
Nintendo Switch games
Nintendo Switch-only games
Square Enix games
Video games developed in Japan
Action role-playing video games
Tose (company) games
Video games scored by Koichi Sugiyama
Single-player video games